Microhydrula is a genus of cnidarians belonging to the family Microhydrulidae.

Species:

Microhydrula pontica

References

Microhydrulidae
Hydrozoan genera